The 2016 Challenger Ciudad de Guayaquil was a professional tennis tournament played on clay courts. It was the twelfth edition of the tournament which was part of the 2016 ATP Challenger Tour. It took place in Guayaquil, Ecuador, between October 31 and November 6, 2016.

Singles main-draw entrants

Seeds

 1 Rankings are as of October 24, 2016.

Other entrants
The following players received wildcards into the singles main draw:
  Iván Endara 
  Gonzalo Escobar 
  Emilio Gómez
  Roberto Quiroz

The following players received entry from the qualifying draw:
  Daniel Elahi Galán 
  Bastián Malla 
  Andrés Molteni 
  João Pedro Sorgi

The following player entered as a lucky loser:
  Michael Linzer

Champions

Singles

 Nicolás Kicker def.  Arthur De Greef 6–3, 6–2

Doubles

 Ariel Behar /  Fabiano de Paula def.  Marcelo Arévalo /  Sergio Galdós 6–2, 6–4

External links
Official Website

Challenger Ciudad de Guayaquil
Challenger Ciudad de Guayaquil
Tennis tournaments in Ecuador